Terence William Bell (born October 27, 1962) is a former Major League Baseball catcher. He was the first round selection of the Seattle Mariners in the 1983 Major League Baseball Draft, two selections ahead of Roger Clemens.

Bell was originally drafted by the Oakland Athletics in the sixth round of the 1980 Major League Baseball Draft as a senior at Fairmont East High School in Kettering, Ohio, but opted to attend Old Dominion University in Norfolk, Virginia instead.  While attending Old Dominion, he participated in the 1982 Amateur World Series and the  Pan American Games. When the Monarchs won the Sun Belt East Division Championship in 1983, he was named a Sporting News All-American and the Sun Belt Conference MVP.

Bell was considered the top defensive catcher in the draft when the Mariners selected Bell with the seventeenth overall pick in 1983. However, he batted just .176 in his first professional season for the Midwest League's Wausau Timbers, and displayed very little power. In three seasons in the Mariners' organization, he batted .233 with two home runs and 64 runs batted in. On May 21, he was dealt to the Kansas City Royals for relief pitcher Mark Huismann.

With the Royals, Bell received a September call-up in 1986. He appeared in eight games, and went hitless in five plate appearances with two walks. On September 3, after spending the entire  season in the minors with the Memphis Chicks, he was the player to be named later in a mid-season deal with the Atlanta Braves for reliever Gene Garber. He appeared in one game for the Braves, and struck out pinch hitting for Ed Olwine.

He continued to play minor league ball for the Braves through . In seven minor league seasons, he batted .231 with eight home runs and 136 RBIs.

Sources

External links

1962 births
Living people
Kansas City Royals players
Atlanta Braves players
Richmond Braves players
Wausau Timbers players
Major League Baseball catchers
Baseball players from Dayton, Ohio
Old Dominion Monarchs baseball players
All-American college baseball players
Chattanooga Lookouts players
Greenville Braves players
Memphis Chicks players
Peninsula Pilots players
Salinas Spurs players
Junior college baseball coaches in the United States